Arsen Grigoryan (Armenian: Արսեն Գրիգորյան, born January 20, 1982) is an Armenian actor, singer and presenter. He is known for his diverse roles in the cinema, theatre and in television productions. He plays the persona of Kamil (Armenian: Կամիլ), an Armenian drag queen.

Life and career

His career began when Grigoryan studied at the Metro Theatre Children's Studio (1995–1997). From 1998 to 2002, he studied at the Yerevan State Institute of Theatre and Cinema, while acting at different theatres.

In 2011, with film director Lilit Movsisyan, Grigoryan made an experimental zero-budget feature-length fiction film Ashtray, which was discussed, praised and criticized after it was finished. Also in 2011 a very spontaneous shooting turned into a real success: Lilit Movsisyan and Grigoryan made an experimental short (starring Grigoryan) which was used in Ridley Scott's  Life in a Day Scott project in the opening part of the film.

From 2013 Grigoryan took acting courses overseas, at Anthony Meindl's Actor Workshop, and The William Esper Studio studying the Meisner technique.

Grigoryan is also well known for his music videos, performing as a singer, director and producer. Many of his released singles were hits. At the end of 2017, Grigoryan as "Kamil" announced that she will compete in Depi Evratesil. In 2018, during her interview on Nice Evening, she said that the song is in Spanish, and it is written by Vahram Petrosyan and Arthur Abgar.

Filmography

Theatre Performances

Music videos

TV Productions

External links

References

1982 births
Living people
21st-century Armenian male singers
Armenian pop singers
Armenian male film actors
Armenian male television actors
21st-century Armenian male actors